La Dormeuse Duval  is a 2017 French comedy film directed by Manuel Sanchez. It stars Dominique Pinon, Marina Tomé, Delphine Depardieu and Pascal Turmo.

Plot

In a village by the Meuse river, located near the French-Belgian border, a factory storekeeper named Basile Matrin leads a dreary life with his wife, Rose. 
The young Maryse Duval, who had just come back from Paris, has abandoned her dreams of becoming an actress. She will unwittingly turn their life upside down. Basile's great friend and neighbour, who is a reporter for a local newspaper « Le Quotidien de la Meuse», witnesses the comical drama that is unfolding on the street outside his house, and will unwillingly be drawn into this «Dramedy» ...

Cast

 Dominique Pinon as Basile Matrin
 Marina Tomé as Rose Matrin
 Delphine Depardieu as Maryse Duval
 Pascal Turmo as Le Journaleux

External links 
 

2017 films
French comedy films
2017 comedy films
2010s French films
2010s French-language films